Blue Orange is a French board-game company.

Blue Orange may also refer to:
 Blue/Orange, an English play
 Blue/Orange (film), a 2005 English film based on the play
 Blue Oranges, a 2009 Bollywood film
 Blue Orange Games, a Californian board-game company
 Blue Orange Theatre, a theater in Birmingham, England

See also
 Blue (disambiguation)
 Orange (disambiguation)
 Orange and Blue (disambiguation)
 Tintin and the Blue Oranges, a 1964 French film